Brendan Canning (born 1969) is a Canadian indie rock performer. He is a founding member of the band Broken Social Scene and a former member of By Divine Right, Blurtonia, Valley of the Giants, Len, and hHead.

Career
Canning began performing in the 1990s, singing and playing guitar, bass and keyboards in several local bands, including hHead and By Divine Right.  In 1999 he and Kevin Drew founded Broken Social Scene, and the band recorded five albums. In 2002 Canning was part of the band Valley of the Giants.

In July 2008 Canning released a solo album called Something for All of Us..., the second release in the "Broken Social Scene Presents" series. The first single from the album is titled "Hit the Wall" and was released on May 5, 2008. 

In 2009 Canning took part in an interactive documentary series called City Sonic, which featured 20 artists from the Toronto area. Canning talked about his connection to the Drake Hotel. Canning was also featured in the 2010 Prairie Coast Films documentary Open Your Mouth And Say... Mr. Chi Pig, a film directed by Sean Patrick Shaul about the life of Mr. Chi Pig of the band SNFU.

On June 12, 2012 Canning's new band, Cookie Duster, released their debut album entitled When Flying Was Easy.  Shortly thereafter, Canning wrote the score for the 2013 film The Canyons.

On October 1, 2013 Canning released his second solo album You Gots 2 Chill, the first to be released on his own record label Draper Street Records. The title of the album is a reference to the EPMD song "You Gots to Chill".  The first single, "Plugged In", was released as a free download. Soon after the album was released he embarked on a North American tour with fellow Toronto band Dinosaur Bones, which included a show at hometown venue Lee's Palace.

Canning signed Vancouver native Rosie June as the first artist to Draper Street Records. The label released her debut album Listening Post in June, 2014. Canning's last album, Home Wrecking Years, was released in August 2016; it includes cameos by Justin Peroff and Sam Goldberg from Broken Social Scene.

Discography

Solo
Something for All of Us (2008)
You Gots 2 Chill (2013)
Home Wrecking Years (2016)

hHead
Fireman (1992)
Jerk (1994)
Ozzy (1996)

By Divine Right
Bless This Mess (1999)

Broken Social Scene
Feel Good Lost (2001)
You Forgot It In People (2002)
Bee Hives (2003)
Broken Social Scene (2005)
Forgiveness Rock Record (2010)
Hug of Thunder (2017)

Valley of the Giants
Valley of the Giants (2004)

Cookie Duster
When Flying Was Easy (2012)

References

External links
 Official site
 Brendan Canning on Spookey Ruben's Dizzy Playground
 Brendan Canning at CitySonic

1969 births
Living people
Canadian rock bass guitarists
Canadian indie rock musicians
Canadian alternative rock musicians
Male actors from Toronto
Musicians from Toronto
Broken Social Scene members
Alternative rock bass guitarists
20th-century Canadian bass guitarists
21st-century Canadian bass guitarists
20th-century Canadian guitarists
21st-century Canadian guitarists
20th-century Canadian male singers
21st-century Canadian male singers
Alternative rock guitarists
20th-century Canadian keyboardists
21st-century Canadian keyboardists
Canadian film score composers
Canadian male singer-songwriters
20th-century Canadian male actors
21st-century Canadian male actors
21st-century Canadian composers
By Divine Right members
Valley of the Giants (band) members